Bridger may refer to:
 
Bridger (name)
Bridger Aerospace (company), headquartered in Montana, United States

Places
In the United States:
 Bridger, Montana, town in Carbon County
 Bridger, Gallatin County, Montana, census-designated place
 Bridger Bowl Ski Area
 Bridger, South Dakota, census-designated place
 Fort Bridger, Wyoming, census-designated place
 Bridger Mountains (Wyoming)
 Bridger Range (Montana)
 Bridger Trail, emigration trail in Wyoming
 Bridger Wilderness, in the Wind River Range, Wyoming
 Bridger-Teton National Forest, Wyoming

Other uses
Operation Bridger, a nationwide police protective security operation for Members of Parliament in the United Kingdom